The tallest structure in Frankfurt is the Europaturm, which rises  however, the observation tower is not generally considered a high-rise building as it does not have successive floors that can be occupied. The tallest habitable building in Frankfurt is the Commerzbank Tower, which rises  and has 56 floors. As of September 2022, it is the 21st-tallest building in Europe and the second tallest building in the European Union. 

The 13 tallest buildings in Germany are located in Frankfurt.

Frankfurt is one of the few European cities with a large cluster of high rise building in its downtown area; in many other European cities, skyscraper construction was not well received in the past due to the historical value of existing buildings. For this reason, Frankfurt is sometimes referred to as "Mainhattan" (a portmanteau of the local Main river and Manhattan), and Chicago am Main. 

Most of Frankfurt's downtown area was destroyed by Allied air bombardment during World War II, and only a small number of the city's landmarks were rebuilt. This left ample room for and little opposition against the construction of modern high-rises in the city. From 1984 until 1993, Frankfurt went through another building boom, during which time the city's second-tallest building, Messeturm, and the third-tallest building, Westendstraße 1, were completed. , the city has 18 buildings which rise at least  in height, more than any other city in Germany.

There are several proposed and approved plans for new skyscrapers, including Millennium Tower, Four I, Four II , ONE,  and Bahn Tower, .

As of October 2011, there are 72 high-rise buildings under construction, approved for construction and proposed for construction in Frankfurt.

Tallest completed buildings
Only habitable building are ranked which excludes radio masts and towers, observation towers, steeples, chimneys and other tall architectural structures. These buildings are included for comparison.

Tallest under construction, announced and proposed

Under construction

Announced

Proposed (selected projects)

Timeline of tallest buildings
This lists buildings that once held the title of tallest building in Frankfurt.

See also
List of tallest buildings in Germany
List of tallest buildings in the European Union
List of tallest buildings in Europe

Notes 
A.  Topped out but not completed.

References
General

Specific

External links
SKYLINE ATLAS - An online book about the skyscrapers in Frankfurt with more than 250 pages - incl. all high-rise buildings under construction and planned
Frankfurt Skyscraper Map
Diagram of Frankfurt skyscrapers on SkyscraperPage.com

!
Frankfurt